Pseudalutarius nasicornis also known as the rhinoceros leatherjacket is a species of filefish native to the Indian and western Pacific Oceans. This species grows to a length of  TL. This species is the only known member of its genus.

References

External links
 

Monacanthidae
Taxa named by Pieter Bleeker
Monotypic ray-finned fish genera